Shahid Abdur Rab Serniabat Textile Engineering College, also known as Sarstec, is a textile engineering college located at Barisal, Bangladesh. It is a constituent college of Bangladesh University of Textiles.

History 

The institution was first launched as a textile institute with the name "Institute of Textiles, Barisal" in 1980. In 2010, it went through a campus wide renovation and was renamed as a college.

Academic outline 

Sarstec offers following Bachelor of Science in engineering programs, written in an alphabetic order:
 BSc in Textile Engineering (major in Apparel Engineering)
 BSc in Textile Engineering (major in Fabric Engineering)
 BSc in Textile Engineering (major in Wet Process Engineering)
 BSc in Textile Engineering (major in Yarn Engineering)
 BSc in Industrial and Production Engineering

Student activity 

Follows a list of student organization active in the campus, written in an alphabetic order:
 Career Club
 Debating Society
 Fabric Club
 Language Club
 Media and Photography Club
 Proyash
 Radio 00.08
 Sports Club
 Ucchhash

Student facility

Residential facility 

Sarstec has housing facility for its regular students. Separate dormitories for male and female students are available in adequate capacity. The boys' hall accommodates for around 400 students and the girls' hall houses around 150 students.

Transportation 

The college has capability to address vehicle necessity in times of industrial tours and study trips for its students and faculty.

References 

Textile schools in Bangladesh
Technological institutes of Bangladesh
Colleges in Bangladesh
2010 establishments in Bangladesh
Educational institutions established in 2010
Colleges affiliated to Bangladesh University of Textiles